Goodenia vilmoriniae is a species of flowering plant in the family Goodeniaceae and is endemic to arid areas of Central Australia. It is an ascending to erect annual herb with linear to lance-shaped leaves at the base of the plant, and racemes of pale blue to lilac flowers.

Description
Flowering mainly occurs from April to September.

Taxonomy and naming
Goodenia vilmoriniae was first formally described in 1862 by Ferdinand von Mueller in Fragmenta phytographiae Australiae from specimens collected by John McDouall Stuart. The specific epithet (vilmoriniae) honours "Madame Vilmorin of Paris".

Distribution
This goodenia grows on rocky or gravelly hills, on sandplains and near ephemeral creeks, in arid scrub and hummock grassland in arid regions of central Western Australia, far northern South Australia, the Northern Territory and Queensland.

Conservation status
Goodenia vilmoriniae is classified as "not threatened" by the Government of Western Australia Department of Parks and Wildlife.

References

vilmoriniae
Eudicots of Western Australia
Flora of South Australia
Flora of the Northern Territory
Flora of Queensland
Taxa named by Ferdinand von Mueller
Plants described in 1862